Fotis Mastihiadis (6 February 1913 – 17 August 1997) was a Greek chess player, and the winner of the 1949 Greek Chess Championship.

Biography
In the 1950s Fotis Mastihiadis was a leading Greek chess player. In 1949, he won Greek Chess Championship.

Fotis Mastihiadis played for Greece in the Chess Olympiads:
 In 1950, at first board in the 9th Chess Olympiad in Dubrovnik (+0, =3, -10),
 In 1952, at fourth board in the 10th Chess Olympiad in Helsinki (+1, =5, -5),
 In 1956, at first reserve board in the 12th Chess Olympiad in Moscow (+1, =1, -5).

He worked as engraver and cartoonist.

References

External links

Fotis Mastihiadis chess games at 365chess.com

1913 births
1997 deaths
Greek chess players
Chess Olympiad competitors
Greek cartoonists
Emigrants from the Ottoman Empire to Greece
Sportspeople from Thessaloniki
People from Ayvalık
20th-century Greek people